Ursula de Jesus (1604–1668) was a Roman Catholic mystic of African descent in 17-century Peru. She was born in Lima, Peru, and was the legitimate daughter of Juan Castilla and Isabel de los Rios. Isabel de los Rios was a slave, leaving Ursula to inherit her mother's status. Ursula de Jesus was an African Peruvian who rose out of slavery to become a donada (religious servant) in the Roman Catholic Church. She lived under her mother's owner, Gerònima de los Rios, until she was roughly eight years old. The daughter of slaves, her first experience with mysticism was when she became the property of Luisa de Melgarejo Sotomayor, a mystic and beata, lay pious woman, in Lima. In 1617 she went to the Convent of Santa Clara in Lima as the servant of Ines del Pulgar, a 16-year-old novice and the niece of the woman who owned her parents. She labored as a slave for forty-three of her sixty-two years.

In 1642 Ursula was known to have a reputation of vanity within the convent and liked to dress well. Ursula saw herself as self-centered, temperamental and vain. She lent a skirt to someone as a favor and they returned it to her soiled. Ursula was eager to wash the skirt as soon as she possibly could. She went to the well to wash it and the platform on which she stood over the well collapsed, leaving Ursula suspended by her own grip and holding on to her life. This was a near-fatal fall and she prayed to the Virgin of Carmel to rescue her. Miraculously, she was able to regain balance and enough leverage to reach safety. This was her testimonial awakening. This near-death experience lead Ursula to change her materialistic views and habits, causing her to devote her life to spirituality and become a servant of God.

For the remainder of her life, Ursula de Jesus sought a life of religious spirituality. In 1645 one of the nuns of the convent purchased her freedom. Although she was denied the ability to become a nun because of her race, she remained at the convent as a donada. She stated that she experienced divine visions, particularly with the souls in purgatory who sought her intercession to gain their release. Throughout her lifetime, she was notable for her mystical visions and her claims of communicating with the souls of those who died and went to purgatory. She felt she had the ability to do so because of her near-death experience.

A diary of her visions and life experiences was created between 1650 and 1661; it was first published in English in 2004. Ursula claimed that trapped nuns within the Purgatory would contact her. Some of the nuns who she came in contact with told her that they were paying a very painful consequence for their behavior during their life and allegedly answered many of Ursula's questions by stating many of them should have paid closer attention during mass rather than participating in spreading gossip and negotiating business. These dead souls of the Purgatory are supposedly trapped there and are communicating with Ursula with high hopes that her prayers may have the ability to alleviate their suffering in Purgatory.

Throughout Ursula's personal journal she recorded complaints about the demanding nuns and how she was spat on and ridiculed. She endures an excessive amount of work and chores when compared to the pampered nuns. Despite the fact that Ursula completely devoted herself to serving God after being freed from slavery, she was never able to come out of the hovering shadow of discrimination. She was still treated differently for her African descent and dark complexion. Oftentimes she showed her vulnerability in her diary when she questioned God why she had to be the one who suffered. According to her, their conversations went as follows:

	
Towards the end of her life, Ursula was sure she would be granted a direct and safe passage to Heaven. She was sure she would be saved because of her selfless efforts and her self-sacrificing ways. Ursula de Jesus died on February 23, 1666. A nun by the name of doña Leonor Basques, a well-respected nun, declared her death should be seen as a "good death" and stated that Ursula de Jesus indeed entered Heaven by preparing her will, disposing of worldly possessions; she confessed her sins and received extreme unction.

See also
Catholic Church in Peru
Religious experience

References

Additional sources 
 

1604 births
1665 deaths
17th-century Christian mystics
Catholic spirituality
Peruvian Roman Catholic religious sisters and nuns
Roman Catholic mystics